The following is a list of the 236 communes of the Haute-Corse department of France.

The communes cooperate in the following intercommunalities (as of 2020):
Communauté d'agglomération de Bastia
Communauté de communes de Calvi Balagne
Communauté de communes du Cap Corse
Communauté de communes de la Castagniccia-Casinca
Communauté de communes du Centre Corse
Communauté de communes de la Costa Verde
Communauté de communes de Fium'Orbu Castellu
Communauté de communes de l'Île-Rousse - Balagne
Communauté de communes de Marana-Golo
Communauté de communes Nebbiu - Conca d'Oro
Communauté de communes de l'Oriente
Communauté de communes Pasquale Paoli

References

Haute-Corse